Brain, Behavior and Evolution is a peer-reviewed scientific journal covering evolutionary neurobiology. It was established in 1968 with Walter Riss as the founding editor-in-chief; he remained the editor until 1986. Subsequent editors included Glenn Northcutt (1986–98) and Walter Wilczynski (1999–2009). The current editor-in-chief is Georg F. Striedter (University of California, Irvine). According to the Journal Citation Reports, the journal has a 2016 impact factor of 1.915.

References

External links

Neuroscience journals
Evolutionary neuroscience
Evolutionary biology journals
Karger academic journals
Publications established in 1968
English-language journals